Roman Kašiar (born 27 January 1998) is a professional footballer who plays as a forward for FSV 08 Bissingen. Born in Germany, Kašiar has represented the Czech Republic at youth international level.

Career statistics

Club

Notes

References

1998 births
Living people
Czech footballers
German footballers
Czech Republic youth international footballers
Association football forwards
SpVgg Ludwigsburg players
VfB Stuttgart players
Stuttgarter Kickers players
FK Pardubice players
FSV Budissa Bautzen players
ZFC Meuselwitz players
VfR Aalen players
Regionalliga players
Czech National Football League players
People from Ludwigsburg
Sportspeople from Stuttgart (region)
Footballers from Baden-Württemberg